Paracheirodon is a genus of freshwater fish in the  family Characidae of the order Characiformes.  The type species is P. innesi, the well-known neon tetra, and the Paracheirodon species are among the fishes known as tetras. All species of this genus are native to the Neotropical realm, occurring in the Orinoco and Amazon Basins in northern South America.

Paracheirodon tetras reach maximum overall lengths of  depending on the species, and are of elongated, tetra shapes.  All share a distinctive iridescent blue lateral line, but differ slightly in their other colorations.

Preferring soft, acidic waters, these midwater shoaling fishes feed predominantly on small crustaceans, insects, worms, and zooplankton.  When spawning, they scatter their eggs and guard neither eggs nor young.

The generic name Paracheirodon derives from the Ancient Greek χείρ (hand), and οδών (teeth), prefixed with παρά (beside) to distinguish it from the similar characin genus Cheirodon.

Species
The currently recognized species in this genus are:

References

 
Tetras
Characidae
Fish of South America
Freshwater fish genera
Taxa named by Jacques Géry